Comoros competed at the 2016 Summer Olympics in Rio de Janeiro, Brazil, from 5 to 21 August 2016. This was the nation's sixth consecutive appearance at the Summer Olympics.

Four Comorian athletes were selected to the team for the Games, competing only in athletics and swimming, Three of them made their Olympic debut in Rio de Janeiro, with hurdler Maoulida Daroueche returning for his second appearance from London 2012. Freestyle swimmer Nazlati Mohamed Andhumdine served as the nation's flag bearer in the opening ceremony. Comoros, has yet to win its first Olympic medal.

Athletics

Comoros has received universality slots from IAAF to send two athletes (one male and one female) to the Olympics.

Track & road events

Swimming

Comoros have received a Universality invitation from FINA to send two swimmers (one male and one female) to the Olympics.

References

External links 
 

Nations at the 2016 Summer Olympics
2016
Olympics